In J. R. R. Tolkien's legendarium, Lothlórien or Lórien is the fairest realm of the Elves remaining in Middle-earth during the Third Age. It is ruled by Galadriel and Celeborn from their city of tree-houses at Caras Galadhon. The wood-elves of the realm are known as Galadhrim.

The realm, a broad woodland between the Misty Mountains and the River Anduin, is the Elven centre of resistance against the Dark Lord Sauron in The Lord of the Rings. Galadriel had one of the Three Elf-Rings, and used it to keep Sauron from seeing into Lothlórien. The Fellowship of the Ring spent some time in Lothlórien after passing through Moria. Galadriel prepared them for their quest with individual gifts.

Scholars have noted that Lothlórien represents variously an Earthly Paradise; an Elfland where time is different, reflecting the traditions of European folklore; and a land of light striving biblically with the darkness of evil.

Fictional description

Names 
Tolkien gave the forest many different names, reflecting its fictional history and the way it is perceived by the different peoples of Middle-earth.

History 

Early in the First Age some of the Eldar left the Great March to Valinor and settled in the lands east of the Misty Mountains. These elves became known as the Nandor and later the Silvan Elves. Galadriel made contact with an existing Nandorin realm, Lindórinand, in what became Lothlórien, and planted there the golden mallorn trees which Gil-galad had received as a gift from Tar-Aldarion.

The culture and knowledge of the Silvan elves was enriched by the arrival of Sindarin Elves from west of the Misty Mountains, and the Silvan language was gradually replaced by Sindarin. Amongst these arrivals was Amdír, who became their first lord, as well as Galadriel and Celeborn, who fled the destruction of Eregion during the War of the Elves and Sauron. In the Third Age, Amroth, the former Lord of Lothlórien, went to the south of Middle-earth with his beloved Nimrodel, but drowned in the Bay of Belfalas after she went missing in the Ered Nimrais and never returned. Control of Lothlórien passed to Galadriel and Celeborn. Galadriel's Ring of Power preserved the land from death and decay, and warded off Sauron's gaze.

As the War of the Ring loomed, the Fellowship of the Ring, emerging from the dark tunnels of Moria and seeing their leader Gandalf perish, was brought through Lothlórien to Caras Galadhon, and there met the Lord and Lady of the Galadhrim. The Fellowship spent roughly a month in Lothlórien, though it seemed to them only a few days. Before they left, Galadriel allowed each of them to look in the Mirror of Galadriel, giving them a glimpse of events in the future or at other times; she also tested their loyalty, and gave each of them a gift for their quest.

After the fall of Sauron, Galadriel and Celeborn rid Dol Guldur of Sauron's influence. Galadriel left for Valinor at the beginning of the Fourth Age, and Celeborn later followed her. The city slowly became depopulated and Lothlórien faded. By the time of the death of Queen Arwen, Celeborn and Galadriel's granddaughter, Lothlórien itself was deserted.

Geography 

Lothlórien lay in the west of Wilderland. To its west stood the Misty Mountains, with the Dwarf-realm of Moria, and on its east ran the great river Anduin. Across the Anduin lay the forest of Mirkwood and the fortress of Dol Guldur, which could be glimpsed from high points in Lothlórien. The river Silverlode or Celebrant flowed through Lothlórien and joined the Anduin; it had a tributary from the west, the river Nimrodel. The realm lay primarily to the north of the Silverlode, with a small strip of forested land to the south. The main part of the realm was the triangular region between the converging rivers called the Naith (Sindarin for "spearhead") by the Elves or the Gore or Angle in the Common Speech. The tip of the Naith was called the Egladil (Sindarin for "elven-point").

Caras Galadhon (from galadh ("tree") was the city of Lothlórien and the main settlement of the Galadhrim in Middle-earth. Founded by Amroth in the Third Age, deep in the forest, the city's dwellings were atop tall mallorn trees; the mallorn had been brought to that land by Galadriel. The city was "some ten miles" from the point where the rivers Silverlode (Sindarin: Celebrant) and Anduin met, close to the eastern border of the realm. In the trees there were many tree-platforms, which could be elaborate dwellings or simple guard-posts. Stairways of ladders were built around the main trees, and at night the city was lit by "many lamps" - "green and gold and silver". The city's entrance was on the southern side.

Analysis

Land of light

The Tolkien scholar Paul H. Kocher writes that Galadriel perceives Sauron with Lothlórien's light, "but cannot be pierced by it in return". The good intelligence has the "imaginative sympathy" to penetrate the evil intelligence, but not vice versa. The Christian author Elizabeth Danna writes that the Elf Haldir's explanation of this [from a flet or tree-platform high above Cerin Amroth], "In this high place you may see the two powers that are opposed to one another, and ever they strive now in thought; but whereas the light perceives the very heart of the darkness, its own secret has not yet been discovered" echoes a biblical description: "The light shineth in darkness; and the darkness comprehended it not." The scholar of humanities Susan Robbins notes that Tolkien, a devout Roman Catholic, associated light as the Bible does with "holiness, goodness, knowledge, wisdom, grace, hope, and God’s revelation", and that Galadriel was one of the bearers of that light.

Earthly paradise

Lothlórien is a locus amoenus, an idyllic land that Tolkien describes as having "no stain". The Tolkien critic Tom Shippey notes that to get there, the Fellowship first wash off the stains of ordinary life by wading the River Nimrodel. He compares this perfect place to the Earthly Paradise that the dreamer speaks of in the Middle English poem Pearl.

But then, Shippey writes, the Fellowship have to cross a rope-bridge over a second river, the Silverlode, which they must not drink from, and which the evil Gollum cannot cross. What place can they have come to then, he wonders: could they be "as if dead"? He notes however that it might be old England, the "'mountains green' of 'ancient time'" in William Blake's Jerusalem. As evidence, Shippey explains that when they come to the deepest part of Lothlórien, the Elf Haldir welcomes them, calling the area the Naith or "Gore", both unfamiliar words for the land between two converging rivers, the Hoarwell or Mitheithel, and the Loudwater or Bruinen, and then giving a third word with a special resonance: the "Angle". Shippey states that the name "England" comes from the Angle (Anglia) between the Flensburg Fjord and the River Schlei, in the north of Germany next to Denmark, the origin of the Angles among the Anglo-Saxons who founded England. He suggests that Frodo's feeling that he has "stepped over a bridge of time into a corner of the Elder Days, and was now walking in a world that was no more" may be exactly correct.

Elfland where time is different

Shippey writes that in Lothlórien, Tolkien reconciles otherwise conflicting ideas regarding time-distortion in Elfland from European folklore, such as is exemplified in the medieval Thomas the Rhymer, who was carried off by the Queen of Elfland, and the Danish ballad Elvehøj (Elf Hill).

The Tolkien scholar Verlyn Flieger writes that the Fellowship debated how much time had passed while they were there, Sam Gamgee recalling that the moon was waning just before they arrived, and was new when they left, though they all felt they had only been there for a few days. She notes that Sam actually exclaims "Anyone would think that time did not count in there!", while Frodo sees Galadriel as "present and yet remote, a living vision of that which has already been left far behind by the flowing streams of Time" and Legolas, an Elf who ought to know how things work in Elven lands, says that time does not stop there, "but change and growth is not in all things and places alike. For Elves the world moves, and it moves both very swift and very slow. Swift, because they themselves change little, and all else fleets by. Slow, because they do not count the running years".

Shippey considers Legolas's explanation to resolve the apparent contradiction between the mortal and Elvish points of view about Elvish time. Flieger however writes that there is a definite contradiction between Frodo's position, that there is an actual difference in time between Lothlórien and everywhere else, and Legolas's, that it is a matter of perception. She considers Aragorn's view to reconcile these two positions, agreeing that time has passed as Legolas said, but that the Fellowship felt time as the Elves did while they were in Lothlórien. That is not, writes Flieger, the end of the matter, as she feels that Aragorn reintroduces the dilemma when he says that the moon carried on changing "in the world outside": this suggests once again that Lothlórien had its own laws of nature, as in a fairy tale.

Flieger writes that while time is treated both naturally and supernaturally throughout The Lord of the Rings, his "most mystical and philosophical deployment of time" concerns Elves. It is therefore "no accident", she writes, that Frodo's has multiple experiences of altered time in Lothlórien, from feeling he has crossed "a bridge of Time" on entering that land, to seeing Aragorn on Cerin Amroth as he was as a young man, dressed in white. Flieger notes that in The Monsters and the Critics Tolkien writes "The human-stories of the elves are doubtless full of the Escape from Deathlessness". In her view, this explains the exploration of time in his mythology, death and deathlessness being the "concomitants" of time and timelessness.

A remembered Warwickshire

The author John Garth writes of a possible Warwickshire connection for Lothlórien. The young Tolkien and his fiancee Edith Bratt visited Warwick; in 1915 he wrote a celebration of Warwickshire, Kortirion Among the Trees. Garth suggests that the central green hill of Cerin Amroth in Lothlórien recalls the grassy Motte of Warwick Castle, known as Ethelfleda's Mound and the happy time he spent there in his youth.

Adaptations

Lothlórien's appearance in Peter Jackson's The Lord of the Rings film trilogy was based on the artwork of the conceptual designer Alan Lee. Some of the Lothlórien scenes were shot on locations in Paradise Valley near Glenorchy, New Zealand.

In The Lord of the Rings Online: Mines of Moria, Lorien was a region introduced to the game in March 2009, which allows players to visit Caras Galadhon and other places, and complete quests from the elves.

Enya's song "Lothlórien" on her album Shepherd Moons is an instrumental composition named for the Elvish realm.

The Dutch composer Johan de Meij wrote music inspired by the Lothlórien woods, as the second movement of his Symphony No. 1 "The Lord of the Rings".

Notes

References

Primary
This list identifies each item's location in Tolkien's writings.

Secondary

Sources

External links

Middle-earth realms
Middle-earth forests